Penn Nouth (15 April 1906 – 18 May 1985) was a Cambodian politician. He served in the French colonial administration, then took active part in Cambodian politics, was several times Prime Minister of Cambodia  (1953, 1954–1955, 1958, 1961) as part of the Sangkum regime of Prince Norodom Sihanouk. He was the first prime minister of an independent Cambodia. He was prime minister for the sixth time from 31 January 1968 to 14 August 1969. On 18 March 1970, when Norodom Sihanouk was deposed by Penn Nouth's successor Lon Nol, Penn Nouth joined the monarch in his exile and became prime minister in the GRUNK coalition. His combined tenure as Prime Minister (5 years, 222 days), spanning seven non-consecutive terms, is the second-longest in Cambodian history after Hun Sen.

After the Khmer Rouge took Phnom Penh in 1975, he served as prime minister of the country for the last time, but did not have real power. He was allowed to leave Cambodia in 1979 along with Sihanouk; he then emigrated.

Honour

Foreign honour
  : Honorary Commander of the Order of the Defender of the Realm (1963)

References

External links
 Monsieur Penn Nouth

1906 births
1985 deaths
20th-century Cambodian politicians 
Cambodian expatriates in France 
Cambodian independence activists
Prime Ministers of Cambodia
Governors of Phnom Penh 
Government ministers of Cambodia
Foreign ministers of Cambodia
Defence ministers of Cambodia
Interior ministers of Cambodia 
Finance ministers of Cambodia 
Cambodian Buddhists
Sangkum politicians 
Democratic Party (Cambodia) politicians